is a former Japanese football player.

Club statistics

References

External links

j-league

1980 births
Living people
University of Tsukuba alumni
Association football people from Nagano Prefecture
Japanese footballers
J2 League players
Japan Football League players
Tokushima Vortis players
Association football midfielders